Wooster Township is one of the sixteen townships of Wayne County, Ohio, United States.  The 2000 census found 5,250 people in the township.

Geography
Located in the central part of the county, it borders the following townships:
Wayne Township - north
Green Township - northeast corner
East Union Township - east
Franklin Township - south
Clinton Township - southwest corner
Plain Township - west
Chester Township - northwest corner

Much of Wooster Township is occupied by the city of Wooster, the county seat of Wayne County. Honeytown is an unincorporated community in the east of the township, just north of Apple Creek.

Name and history
It is the only Wooster Township statewide.

Government
The township is governed by a three-member board of trustees, who are elected in November of odd-numbered years to a four-year term beginning on the following January 1. Two are elected in the year after the presidential election and one is elected in the year before it. There is also an elected township fiscal officer, who serves a four-year term beginning on April 1 of the year after the election, which is held in November of the year before the presidential election. Vacancies in the fiscal officership or on the board of trustees are filled by the remaining trustees.

References

External links
Wayne County township map
County website
Wooster Township Fire & Rescue

Townships in Wayne County, Ohio
Townships in Ohio